Aamer Gul (born 27 December 1974 in Lahore) is a Pakistani former first-class cricketer active 1994–1998 who played for Bahawalpur, Lahore City and National Bank of Pakistan. Aamer Gul was a right-handed batsman and a right-arm off break bowler.

References

1974 births
Pakistani cricketers
Bahawalpur cricketers
Lahore City cricketers
National Bank of Pakistan cricketers
Living people